Liberia requires its residents to register their motor vehicles and display vehicle registration plates. Nigeria and Liberia are the only two African countries that use the North American standard 6 × 12 inches (152 × 300 mm).

Private vehicles are prefixed "A" (personal), "B", and "C", probably for cargo.

Diplomatic Corps
The diplomatic fleet is identified by a code consisting of up to three numbers, followed by CD or CMD and another number.

References

Liberia
Road transport in Liberia